Fellowship Baptist College (FBC) is a non-stock, private and sectarian institution in Kabankalan, Negros Occidental, Philippines established in 1954.

History 
Formerly known as "Fellowship Baptist Academy", the institution was founded by Baptist lay ministers, leaders and missionaries from the Visayan Fellowship of Fundamental Baptist Churches. It is a sectarian, non-stock and non-profit educational institution. Aside from student fees, it exists mainly upon benevolent donations from Fundamental Baptist churches organization, individual Christians and later from the alumni and its organization.

It opened in 1954 with an enrollment of 212 students. It faithfully carried out its mission. In 1957, Fellowship Baptist Academy was given government recognition. In June 1982, the school operated a post-secondary course in Midwifery. The following year, it opened two degree courses which are Bachelor of Science in Business Administration and Bachelor of Arts. Upon conferring the government recognition to these two courses, DECS acted favorably in school year 1989-1990 on the change of the status of the school from "Academy" to "College".

Academics 
FBC offers pre-school, grade school, junior high school, senior high school, and undergraduate and graduate level programs.

Its senior high school program has three (3) strands in the academic track, namely:

 Accountancy, Business and Management (ABM)
 Humanities and Social Sciences (HUMSS)
 Science, Technology, Engineering and Mathematics (STEM)

And three specialty courses for the Technological-Vocational (TECH-VOC) track, namely:

 Cookery
 Caregiving
 Information and Communication Technology (ICT)

As of 2019, it has six academic colleges namely:

College of Teacher Education, Arts and Sciences
College of Business and Accountancy
College of Engineering and Computer Studies
College of Pharmacy and Allied Health Programs
College of Criminal Justice Education
College of Library and Information Sciences

References

External links 

Universities and colleges in Negros Occidental